Wilbur Wright Field is a WWI airfield near Dayton, Ohio.

Wright Field or variation, may also refer to:

Places
 Wright-Patterson Air Force Base (formerly Wright Field), Ohio, US
 Belwood (Wright Field) Aerodrome,  an airstrip in Belwood, Ontario, Canada
 Wright Brothers National Memorial, the field where the Wrights first flew in Kill Devil Hills, North Carolina, US
 Wright Brothers Field, Jezero Crater, Mars; the place where the Ingenuity Mars helicopter drone first flew
 Wright's Field in Alpine, Alpine, California, US; a nature reserve
 Wright Field, a baseball park in North Pole, Alaska, US, home field for the North Pole Nicks

Other uses
 Wright Field (writer), American writer

See also
 Alumni Field (Wright State) (Wright State University Alumbi Field), a soccer pitch in Dayton, Ohio, USA
 Fielding L. Wright (1895–1956), U.S. politician
 Wright (disambiguation)
 Field (disambiguation)